Garra ethelwynnae is a species of ray-finned fish in the genus Garra which is known only from Eritrea.
The specific name of this fish honours the British ichthyologist Ethelwynn Trewavas (1900-1993).

References 

Endemic fauna of Eritrea
Garra
Taxa named by Ambat Gopalan Kutty Menon
Fish described in 1958